This is a list of prior winners of the Texas University Interscholastic League's annual State One-Act Play competition.

References

University Interscholastic League